AVD may refer to:

 AVD, the United States Navy hull classification symbol for "seaplane tender destroyer"
 Alviri-Vidari language, an Iranian language (ISO 639-3 abbreviation)
 Audio, Video, Disco, 2011 album by the electronic music duo Justice
 Automobilclub von Deutschland, Germany's oldest automobile club
 Avadi railway station, Tamil Nadu, India (railroad station abbreviation)
 Apparent volume of distribution, distribution of a drug
 Assisted vaginal delivery
 Aqueous vermiculite dispersion, a fire extinguisher medium specifically designed for suppressing fires in lithium-ion batteries